Peter Hindley  (19 May 1944 – 1 February 2021), nicknamed 'Tank', was an English footballer who played in the Football League for Nottingham Forest, Coventry City and Peterborough United. He represented England at under-23 level.

Ian Storey-Moore, a fellow Forest team member, is quoted as saying "Peter Hindley was tough as old boots for us. No one messed with him'.

His father, Frank Hindley, played League football for Nottingham Forest and Brighton & Hove Albion either side of the Second World War.

Peter Hindley finished his playing career at non-league Burton Albion who were then managed by former Forest team mate Ian Storey-Moore. He had two full seasons with Burton, playing in 97 games and scoring once.

After he finished playing football, Hindley remained in the Peterborough area and became a Painter and Decorator. He also owned Greyhounds.

He died from dementia, on 1 February 2021, at the age of 76.

References

1944 births
2021 deaths
Footballers from Worksop
English footballers
England under-23 international footballers
Association football defenders
Nottingham Forest F.C. players
Coventry City F.C. players
Peterborough United F.C. players
Burton Albion F.C. players
English Football League players
Deaths from dementia in the United Kingdom